Tusen gånger starkare (A Thousand Times Stronger) is a 2006 young adult novel written by Christina Herrström. It was nominated to the August Prize the same year.

Plot
The book is about the power between the two sexes (boys and girls).

In the 15-year-old girl Signe's class the "bad" boys and the popular girl Mimi have much power. When a new girl, Saga, comes to the class, the situation is changed; she breaks the "rules" for showing how girls should act. At first the teachers like her actions but when the other girls follow her advice, the situation becomes chaotic.

Film
In 2010 a film based on the book was produced.

References

2006 Swedish novels
Young adult novels
Swedish-language novels
Swedish novels adapted into films